The Mazda CX-7 is a mid-size crossover SUV from Mazda, and is the production version of the MX-Crossport concept car. It was shown publicly for the first time at the 2006 LA Auto Show in January. Production officially began on February 20, 2006 in Mazda's Ujina #2 factory in Hiroshima, and went on sale in April 2006 as a 2007 model. The CX-7 was Mazda's first mid-size SUV since the Navajo was discontinued in 1994. 

The CX-7 was positioned below the larger Mazda CX-9; the vehicles did not share platforms. Instead, it used the Ford C1 platform that underpinned the Ford Focus and Mazda3. The CX-7 was discontinued in August 2012 in favor of the new Mazda CX-5.

Specifications

Engine and transmission
Power comes from the same 2.3 L inline-4 MZR L3-VDT DISI engine used in the Mazdaspeed3 and Mazdaspeed6 coupled with a six-speed Aisin F21 automatic transmission, and tuned to produce 244 hp or 182 kW (Australian model 175 kW) at 5000 rpm and 258 lb·ft (350 N·m) of torque at a low 2500 rpm, 99% of the maximum torque is available to 5000 rpm.

The MZR 2.3L DISI turbo engine was retuned in the North American specification CX-7 to deliver torque at a lower rpm for less turbo lag off the line, at the cost of power. This was achieved thanks to a redesigned, smaller K04 turbocharger. United Kingdom specification CX-7s featured the same, larger K04 turbocharger and transmission found in the Mazdaspeed line.

Suspension
The CX-7 shares the front suspension of the Mazda MPV minivan, and the rear suspension from the Mazda5.

Interior
The pre-facelift CX-7's steering wheel is shared with the third generation Mazda MX-5 and the Biante.

Model range, prices and features
The CX-7 features fully independent suspension, four wheel ventilated disc brakes with standard anti-lock brakes, electronic stability control, and traction control, and a choice of either front-wheel drive, or Mazda's Active Torque Split all-wheel drive system. With the Active Torque Split system, two computer controlled magnetic clutches feed up to 50% of the engine's torque to the rear wheels. 

As of the model of 2010, there are four trim levels (model), iSV, iSport, sTouring, and sGrand Touring in ascending equipment levels. Touring and Grand Touring models are available with all wheel drive and are offered with the 2.3L turbocharged engines. SV and Sport trims come with a 2.5 L MZR L5-VE naturally aspirated DOHC inline four engine. 

Canadian models included GS Front Wheel Drive, GS All Wheel Drive, GT Front Wheel Drive, GT All Wheel Drive. Australian models (AWD only) included "CX-7 Classic" Base trim and "CX-7 Luxury" upper trim. Models for the United Kingdom (AWD only) were not offered at the same time and included 2.3T and 2.2D 'Sport Tech'.

Update 
The front and rear exterior fascias were revised with the front adopting the larger five point grille design similar in appearance to the contemporary RX-8, MX-5 and Mazda3/Axela. 

The interior gauges were revised, with blackout meters that featured three dimensional dials, a 3.5 inch super twisted nematic (STN) monochrome and 4.1 inch thin film transistor (TFT) color Multi Information Display (MID), (positioned at the top of the instrument panel), Bluetooth compatibility, and a Blind Spot Monitoring System. 

The car was unveiled at the February 2009 Canadian International AutoShow. The diesel version included a manual transmission, and was sold in Europe from 2009 to 2012.

Pre-facelift styling

Post-facelift styling

Offroad capabilities
While officially classed as a 'Mid size crossover SUV', the Mazda CX-7 is considered as a 'Soft Roader' by automotive sources. The CX-7 featured an active torque split four wheel drive system, which sends up to 50% of the torque to the rear wheels on a slippery surface, to ensure a consistency of grip.

Technical specifications

Transmission is a five speed automatic for the 2.5, and a six speed automatic for the 2.3 DISI Turbo engine.

Safety
Euro NCAP
Euro NCAP test results for a model of 2010:

NHTSA
NHTSA safety ratings for a model of 2007:

IIHS
IIHS safety ratings for a model of 2012:

Accolades
2007 International Car of the Year Awards: Crossover.
2008 RJC Car of the Year Special Award: Best SUV.
2009–2011 Autocar Indonesia Reader's Choice Award, Favorite Medium SUV 4x4.

Replacement
Initially, it was expected the CX-7 nameplate would be reused on an all new seven seater based on a stretched Mazda CX-5, due to the growing popularity of three row crossovers.  However, in mid 2017, Mazda instead announced the Mazda CX-8 three row crossover, which is essentially a long wheelbase version of the second generation CX-5, and was released in Japan on September 14, 2017.

References

External links

 Official UK CX-7 campaign site (archived)

CX-7
Cars introduced in 2006
2010s cars
Mid-size sport utility vehicles
Crossover sport utility vehicles
Front-wheel-drive vehicles
All-wheel-drive vehicles
Euro NCAP small off-road